Dhoti Lota Aur Chowpatty is a 1975 Bollywood comedy film directed by Mohan Choti and noted for its large cast and guest appearances. The film was released under the banner of Mohan Choti Production.

Cast
Mohan Choti as Mohan Choti 
Dharmendra as Madman 
Dulari as Mohan's mom
Helen as Madame
Nazir Hussain as Girdharilal Paniwala
Jagdeep as Film hero
Farida Jalal as Rajni
Sanjeev Kumar as Inspector Wagle
Mehmood as Plainclothes policeman
Shubha Khote as Girdharilal's sister
Ranjeet as Ranjeet 
Tun Tun as Film heroine's mom
Bindu as dancer
Yunus Parvez as Havaldar Naik 
Jankidas
Jeevan
Satyendra Kapoor
Roopesh Kumar
Mac Mohan
Keshto Mukherjee
Prem Nath as Imandar Pauwala
Vijay Bhayana as Gang member at Bus Stop
Rajendra Nath   
Neena   
Joginder Shelly
Nilu Phule
Om Prakash
Laxmi Chhaya

Soundtrack

Music was composed by Shyamji Ghanshyamji.

References

External links
 

1975 films
1970s Hindi-language films
Indian comedy-drama films